Laurence Earl Mattingly (November 4, 1904 in Newport, Maryland – September 8, 1993 in Brookeville, Maryland) was a pitcher in Major League Baseball. He pitched in eight games for the 1931 Brooklyn Robins.

External links

1904 births
1993 deaths
Baseball players from Maryland
Major League Baseball pitchers
Brooklyn Robins players
Richmond Colts players
Newark Bears (IL) players
Asheville Tourists players
Macon Peaches players
Hartford Senators players
Jersey City Skeeters players
Baltimore Orioles (IL) players
Syracuse Chiefs players
People from Brookeville, Maryland